was a town located in Hata District, Kōchi Prefecture, Japan.

As of 2003, the town had an estimated population of 3,240 and a density of 16.26 persons per km². The total area was 199.32 km².

On March 20, 2006, Taishō, along with the town of Kubokawa (from Takaoka District), and the town of Towa (also from Hata District), was merged to create the town of Shimanto (in Takaoka District) and no longer exists as in independent municipality.

External links
 Official website of Shimanto 

Dissolved municipalities of Kōchi Prefecture
Shimanto, Kōchi (town)